Jenny Taylor (born 22 October 1955) is a cultural analyst and journalist and founder of Lapido Media, a consultancy specialising in religious literacy in world affairs. She has travelled widely, especially in the Islamic world, visiting the South Asian headquarters of Muslim groups settled in Great Britain, and writing and commenting on the work of civil society organisations all over Asia and Africa. She is an expert on the connection between faith and culture, on which she has addressed parliamentary and Commonwealth gatherings. Her doctorate is from SOAS in London on Islam and secularisation. She is an advisor to the Relationships Foundation and a former Whitefield Institute grantee. She is the author of A Wild Constraint: the Case for Chastity.

Background 
Taylor grew up in a Utopian community founded by the Quakers to settle Sunderland miners on the land after the First World War, where they could grow vegetables and recover their health. Her father was part of a subsequent wave of settlers back home from the British colonies in the 1950s. Her family managed to eke a living off the proceeds of four acres of glasshouses which her father built by hand. They grew lettuces and tomatoes for 40 years until the European Economic Community destroyed their market and the Land Settlement Association went bust. She attended Christ's Hospital before going on to study an Honours degree in English Literature and Politics at Durham University. Later, Taylor studied for a doctorate in the sociology of religion at the School of Oriental and African Studies, London University and has published many articles, papers and chapters on Islam and Christianity in Great Britain.

Career 
In 1978, Taylor became an indentured reporter with The Goole Times, part of the Yorkshire Post Group, where she was elected Mother of the Chapel. Two years later she moved to Swindon as a newly qualified Senior Reporter with the Evening Advertiser. Following nationwide 1981 England riots she became Westminster Press's first Race Relations Correspondent. 
Between 1988 and 1990 she was the National Launch Press Officer for Christmas Cracker, gaining nationwide media coverage for a new concept in fund-raising and originating and launching The World's Biggest Christmas Cracker on London's South Bank. During her six years as Editor and Press Officer for international charity,  Interserve UK,(from 1988), she redeveloped GO magazine, doubling its circulation including securing a readership for it in the USA. She also devised and researched Nambikkai for BBC2's See Hear, which was later broadcast several times as part of the successful campaign to release the deaf charity worker, Ian Stillman. 
In 1991–1992, she was Communications Officer for the British Council of Churches' The Gospel & Our Culture programme. She was also responsible for the Westminster launch of The Gospel in Contemporary Society, which topped religious best-seller lists, and a self-funding video study pack, It's No Good Shouting, which was adopted as core material in at least two-degree courses.
As Associate Editor for Third Way Magazine, high-profile interviewees included Shadow Secretary of State for Education Michael Gove; novelist Fay Weldon; Sir Iqbal Sacranie, General Secretary of Muslim Council of Britain; Sir John Stevens, former Commissioner of the Metropolitan Police Service.

She undertook various research and communication contracts including in 2001, a four-year contract as Head of Media for the Church Mission Society in London. Her responsibilities included setting up and running a new CMS Media and Public Affairs Unit. She devised and led CMS' Break the Silence Campaign to end war in Northern Uganda, which was commended in the British parliament in 2004. This work resulted in the tripling of United Nations aid to Northern Uganda and contributed to a reduction in hostilities and break-up of Internally Displaced Persons (IDP) camps. She also managed the news pages of the CMS website and edited a monthly supporters' radio programme which was presented by Caroline Swinburne.

Taylor reported from Sudan, Uganda, Sierra Leone and South Africa, and acted as a media spokesperson on BBC's Woman's Hour, The World Today, Heart & Soul and Channel News Asia. A freelance since 1994, Taylor's articles have appeared in the London Evening Standard, the Daily Telegraph, The Guardian, The Spectator and European and church press.

Lapido Media 

Taylor founded Lapido Media in 2005, a consultancy specialising in religious literacy in world affairs. She now works with journalists to improve the coverage of the social and political impact of religion and provides education and training for opinion formers in political religion. She undertakes research and writes about the religious reinforcement of human rights and human rights abuse and provides consultancy on campaigns and media strategy for faith-based charities working outside of the UK.

Publications 
Taylor's writings include the following:
‘A Media Friendly Cracker’ in The Christmas Cracker Manual  Kingsway: 1990
‘Faith and Power: Christianity and Islam in 'Secular' Britain (with Lesslie Newbigin & Lamin Sanneh), London: SPCK, 1998.
‘Newbigin's Understanding of Islam’ in A Scandalous Prophet: Newbigin's Mission Revisited ed. Prof. Werner Ustorf (Eerdman's: 2002)
'After Secularism: Governance and the Inner Cities’ in Predicting Religion: Margins and Mainstream in the West (Ashgate: 2003)
'Taking Spirituality Seriously: Northern Uganda and CMS’ Break the Silence Campaign’ in Round Table – Commonwealth Journal of International Affairs 382, pp. 559 –574 (Routledge: October 2005) 
 Faith and Power: Christianity and Islam in ‘Secular’ Britain Co-authors: Lesslie Newbigin, Prof. Lamin Sanneh (Wipf & Stock, Oregon USA: 2005) 
 A Wild Constraint:the Case for Chastity (Continuum: 2009)

Lectures and presentations 

 1996	‘Islam in Britain’ at Guthrie Centre for Islamic Studies, London Bible College, Northwood  Summer School.
  1997 'Dilemmas for the Law in Multicultural Britain' at de Bron Consultation, London Faith and Power: Christianity and Islam in ‘Secular Britain’.
 2000	‘Kenosis or Conflict? Discourses of Power in the Inner Cities Religious Council’ at Tyndale Conference, Nantwich  God's Unfolding Purposes.
 2000	‘After Secularism: Governance and the Inner Cities’ at Exeter University British Sociological Association Sociology of Religion Study Group 25th Anniversary Conference Prophets and Predictions.
 2001	‘Faiths and Government: Who's Using Whom?’ at Edmonton Diocesan Conference, Catalysts for a Change, organised by Revd Chris Beales.
 2004	The Global Dimension of Women Trafficking – to Women on the Move Group, at The Commonwealth Institute, Northumberland Ave, 16 June.
 2005  ‘Reporting Islam’ to Gegrapha – Christians in Journalism Fellowship, St. Michael's Church, Chester Square, London on 7 October.
 2005	Guest preacher at Evensong, Jesus College, University of Cambridge.  9 October.
 2006	‘The Commonwealth, multiculturalism, faith and tolerance’ to The Round Table – The Commonwealth Journal of International Affairs The Commonwealth after Valletta Conference, Cumberland Lodge, 5–6 January.
  2006	'The Need for a new Religious Political Discourse' at Bible Society Parliamentary Symposium on Faith, Politics and the Media, Doing God and Finding the Language, Portcullis House, Westminster, 9 May
 2006	Inaugural Lesslie Newbigin Memorial Lecture 'RIP Secularism 7 July: Lesslie Newbigin and the London Bombings’ at Christian Resources Exhibition, Sandown, 12 May.
 2008	‘Islam, religious freedom and the media in Britain’, at Oxford Centre for Religion in Public Life Conference, Understanding and Reporting on Religion, Prague, Czech Republic, 11–14 June.
  2008	Plenary paper, 'The Role of Religious Illiteracy and the Clash of Values' at Think Tank Thurgau Symposium for Future Leaders, Stein am Rhine, Switzerland, 29 September.
  2010 The Numbers Game: Britain's Changing Demographic and its Implications for Christian-Muslim Relation at Centre for Islamic Studies, London School of Theology, 24 April.
•  2010 'Defamation of Religion: UK Atheists lead the fight against the OIC campaign’ at The Media Project Conference, Defamation of Religion Versus Press Freedom, 8–13 August.

References

External links 
 LapidoMedia.com
 BBC Radio 4 Woman's Hour – Virginity

1955 births
People from Sunderland
Living people
Alumni of SOAS University of London
British journalists
Alumni of St Aidan's College, Durham